"Fury Eyes" is a song recorded by English band the Creatures (aka singer Siouxsie Sioux and drummer Budgie). The song was co-produced by Mike Hedges. It was remixed by Pascal Gabriel for release as the second single of the critically acclaimed Boomerang album.

The song was inspired by the 1988 novel In the Eyes of Mr. Fury by Philip Ridley. The single was released prior to the duo's first ever European tour. The cover and artwork were created by Anton Corbijn and Area. The photo session took place in Andalucia, Spain in May 1989.

The song was also popular on US alternative radio, reaching number 12 on the Billboard Modern Rock Tracks chart on 17 March 1990.

Notes

1990 singles
The Creatures songs
1989 songs
Polydor Records singles
Geffen Records singles
Song recordings produced by Mike Hedges
Songs written by Siouxsie Sioux
Songs written by Budgie (musician)